Arhopala meander , the bright oakblue, is a butterfly in the family Lycaenidae. It was described by Jean Baptiste Boisduval in 1832. It is found in the Australasian realm (Trobriand Island, Fergusson Island, Woodlar Island, New Guinea, Aru, Ambon, Waigeu, Louisiades, and Australia (Cape York)).

References

External links

Arhopala Boisduval, 1832 at Markku Savela's Lepidoptera and Some Other Life Forms. Retrieved June 3, 2017.

Arhopala
Butterflies described in 1832